Amon B. King (1807–1836) was an American military leader in the Texas Revolution.

References

1807 births
1836 deaths
People of the Texas Revolution